Marin Šipić (born 29 April 1996) is a Croatian handball player for HC Kriens-Luzern and the Croatian national team.

He represented Croatia at the 2020 European Men's Handball Championship.

References

External links

1996 births
Living people
People from Main-Taunus-Kreis
Sportspeople from Darmstadt (region)
Croatian male handball players
Competitors at the 2018 Mediterranean Games
Mediterranean Games gold medalists for Croatia
Mediterranean Games medalists in handball
21st-century Croatian people